The Pic des Spijeoles is a French pyrenean summit, culminating at .

Toponymy 
The name comes from gascon eths picholes (pronounced es pitcholes), meaning « smalls rills » ("spijeole" is an erroneous derivation).

Geography 
It lies in the High Luchonnais near the spa town of Bagnères-de-Luchon, on the border of the hautes-Pyrénées and Haute-Garonne departments.

History 
The first ascent by normal route was made by Henry Russell and guide from Luchon Firmin Barrau on June 30, 1880.

On September 6, 1906, luchonese pyreneist Marcel fell victim of a fatal fall at la brèche "gap" des Spijeoles.

Access 
The Spijeoles ascension from the barns of Astau and the refuge d'Espingo (normal route) is quite long though without any real difficulty (aside from in foggy conditions). Even in Summer and in good weather conditions, it is reserved for skilled hikers. It offers a superb panorama on the central Pyrenees and la vallée de Luchon. The 2000 m climb often requires a sleep at le refuge d'Espingo.

See also 
 List of Pyrenean three-thousanders

References 

Mountains of the Pyrenees
Mountains of Hautes-Pyrénées
Landforms of Haute-Garonne
Pyrenean three-thousanders